This is a list of filters for the photo-editing application Prisma to render images with an artistic effect.

Artists 
Artists represented through the app via the filters include Marc Chagall, Hokusai, Wassily Kandinsky, Roy Lichtenstein, Isaac Levitan, Hayao Miyazaki, Piet Mondrian, Alphonse Mucha, Edvard Munch, Francis Picabia, and Pablo Picasso.

List of Prisma filters

Reception 
In July 2016, Wiknixs Jay Bokhiria called Candy, Dreams, Gothic, Mosaic, and Roland the best Prisma filters. The Telegraphs Pramita Ghosh and Riddhima Khanna picked out five filters: Heisenberg, Marcus D – Lone Wolf, Mosaic, Roland, and Udnie. India TV said Bobbie, #FollowMeTo, Mondrian, The Scream, and Udnie were the best filters while "you can ignore the rest." Stuffs Sam Kieldsen favored the Curtain, Electric, and MIOBI filters with "work well with almost any sort of shot you use" as well as Heisenberg "can be brilliantly effective when used with the right base shot." However, Kieldsen critiqued the filters Impression and Mondrian with "rarely seem to produce anything worth looking at." The Kitchns Ariel Knutson used the filters Candy, Gothic, Femme, Ice Cream, Mononoke, Mosaic, Raoul, Tokyo, and Udnie for various food photography. Knutson called Gothic "the most bold of all the filters." Knutson called Udnie "my favorite filter for the whole app." Aussie Network Newss Cat Suclo ranked Femme, Mononoke, and Tears as the three best filters.

In August 2016, The Times of Indias Anandi Mishra called Bobbie, #FollowMeTo, Mononoke, The Scream, Tokyo, and Udnie as popular filters.

References

Prisma filters